Irenodendron is a genus of three species of shrubs and trees in the willow family Salicaceae native to northern South America. These species were previously treated as a section of the genus Laetia in the family Flacourtiaceae, but the genus Laetia and its relatives were moved to the Salicaceae based on analyses of DNA data. Irenodendron was later hypothesized to be more closely related to the genera Ryania, Trichostephanus, and Piparea due to the presence of an apically divided style, and wood with dark heartwood and large rays; it differs from those genera in having cup-shaped bracts under the flowers and in lacking staminodes.

References 

Salicaceae
Flora of South America
Salicaceae genera